The football tournament at the 1983 Southeast Asian Games was held from 28 May to 6 June 1983 in Singapore.

Teams

Tournament

Group stage

Group A

Group B

Knockout stage

Semi-finals

Bronze medal match

Gold medal match

Winners

Medal winners

Notes

References 

Veroeveren, Piet, Southeast Asian Games 1983. RSSSF
SEA Games 1983 AFF official website

Southeast
Football at the Southeast Asian Games
1983
1983 in Singaporean sport
1983 Southeast Asian Games events